Mary McDermott (fl. 1832) was an Irish poet.

McDermott was living in Killyleagh, County Down, upon publication of her first volume in 1832. She also composed occasional music to accompany her verses. My Early Dreams was dedicated to Elizabeth Albana, wife of Frederick Hervey, 1st Marquess of Bristol.

Bibliography
 My Early Dreams, Belfast, 1832.
 Lays of Love, Dublin, 1859.

References
 McDermott, Mary, p. 149, in Dictionary of Nineteenth-Century Irish Women Poets, Ann Elry Colman, Kenny's Bookshop, Galway, 1996. .

Irish poets
Irish women poets
People from County Down
Year of death missing
Year of birth missing